The National Equities Exchange And Quotations (NEEQ) is a Chinese over-the-counter system for trading the shares of a public limited company that is not listed on either the Shenzhen or Shanghai stock exchanges. The NEEQ exchange was also nicknamed "The New Third Board" in China, as there were two old trading systems that the NEEQ replaced, STAQ and NET.

On September 3, 2021, Chinese leader Xi Jinping announced that NEEQ will be reformed and Beijing Stock Exchange will be set up. The new Beijing Stock Exchange will be a part of the NEEQ, based on the former NEEQ Select Board.

Shareholders
Shareholders of National Equities Exchange And Quotations Co., Ltd:
 Shanghai Stock Exchange
 Shenzhen Stock Exchange
 Shanghai Futures Exchange
 China Securities Depository and Clearing Corporation
 China Financial Futures Exchange
 Dalian Commodity Exchange
 Zhengzhou Commodity Exchange

See also
 list of companies in the National Equities Exchange and Quotations

References

External links
 

Chinese companies established in 2012
Economy of Beijing
Stock exchanges in China
Companies based in Beijing
National Equities Exchange and Quotations